Sallie Kim is currently a U.S. magistrate judge of the United States District Court for the Northern District of California.

Education
Judge Kim earned her undergraduate degree from Princeton University in 1986 with an A.B. in the Woodrow Wilson School, cum laude, and received her law or Juris Doctor degree, from Stanford Law School in 1989. While at Stanford Law School, Judge Kim also served as the Chair of the Asian Law Students Association (now known as Asian Pacific Islander Law Students Association) and was a member of the Stanford Law Review. Judge Kim also won the prize for Best Team of Advocates in the Kirkwood Moot Court Competition at Stanford Law School in 1989.

Career
Upon graduation from law school, Judge Kim served as a judicial law clerk for the Honorable Spencer Mortimer Williams, U.S. district judge of the U.S. District Court for the Northern District of California.

Judge Kim then entered private civil litigation practice with an emphasis on intellectual property and federal securities law, first with the Palo Alto firm of Wilson, Sonsini, Goodrich & Rosati and then with Heller, Ehrman, White & McAuliffe.

From 1995-99, Judge Kim served as Associate and Assistant Dean for Student Affairs at Stanford Law School, then returned to private civil litigation practice in 1999, where she eventually became a Partner with the law firm of GCA Law Partners in 2002. She served as a partner at GCA Law Partners from 2002 until her appointment in 2015.

Judge Kim's professional activities outside of regular civil litigation practice have included service as Co-Director of the Trial Advocacy Program and Lecturer in Law at Stanford Law School beginning in 2014; the Interim Title IX Coordinator for Stanford University in 2013 and 2014; and Volunteer Deputy District Attorney for Santa Clara County for 14 weeks in 2010.

Judicial service
Chief Judge Phyllis Hamilton swore Judge Kim in as a Magistrate Judge.

See also
United States District Court for the Northern District of California
United States Court of Appeals for the Ninth Circuit

External links
The Honorable Sallie Kim, U.S. Magistrate Judge, United States District Court for the Northern District of California
New Magistrate Judge Sallie Kim Joins San Francisco Division
Sallie Kim, Stanford Law School, Lecturer Biography
The Recorder: In Chambers With S.F.'s Newest Magistrate Judge
Sallie Kim: Ballotpedia

References

Living people
American lawyers
Princeton University alumni
United States magistrate judges
People from San Francisco
21st-century American judges
Stanford Law School alumni
Year of birth missing (living people)